The 1992 Continental Grass Court Championships was a men's ATP-tennis tournament held in Rosmalen, Netherlands. It was played on outdoor grass courts and was part of the ATP World Series of the 1992 ATP Tour. It was the third edition of the tournament and was held from 8 June until 14 June 1992. First-seeded Michael Stich won the singles title.

Finals

Singles

 Michael Stich defeated  Jonathan Stark 6–4, 7–5
 It was Stich's 1st singles title of the year and the 6th of his career.

Doubles

 Jim Grabb /  Richey Reneberg defeated  John McEnroe /  Michael Stich 6–4, 6–7, 6–4

References

External links
 ITF tournament edition details
 

Rosmalen Grass Court Championships
Ordina Open
Rosmalen Grass Court Championships